Michael Kiedel (born 23 December 1975 in Stuttgart) is a German former swimmer who competed in the 2000 Summer Olympics.

References

1975 births
Living people
German male swimmers
German male freestyle swimmers
Olympic swimmers of Germany
Swimmers at the 2000 Summer Olympics
Sportspeople from Stuttgart
European Aquatics Championships medalists in swimming
Universiade medalists in swimming
Goodwill Games medalists in swimming
Universiade bronze medalists for Germany
Medalists at the 1997 Summer Universiade
Competitors at the 1998 Goodwill Games
20th-century German people
21st-century German people